Fleetwood—Port Kells is a federal electoral district in the province of British Columbia, Canada, that has been represented in the House of Commons of Canada since 2004.

Geography
It consists of the northeast part of the City of Surrey, Barnston Island, and Barnston Island Indian Reserve No. 3 the Greater Vancouver Regional District. The communities of Fleetwood, East Newton, Fraser Heights, Port Kells and North Clayton are contained within this riding.

Demographics

According to the Canada 2011 Census

Languages: 46.9% English, 17.6% Punjabi, 8.8% Chinese, 4.9% Tagalog, 4.0% Korean, 2.8% Vietnamese, 2.3% Hindi, 1.1% Spanish, 11.6% Other
Religions: 43.0% Christian, 19.6% Sikh, 3.7% Muslim, 3.6% Buddhist, 3.3% Hindu, 0.4% Other, 26.4% None
Median income: $26,124 (2010) 
Average income: $34,327 (2010)

History
The electoral district was created in 2003 from Surrey Central and some of Surrey North riding.

The 2012 federal electoral boundaries redistribution concluded that the electoral boundaries of Fleetwood—Port Kells should be adjusted, and a modified electoral district of the same name will be contested in future elections. The redefined Fleetwood—Port Kells gains very small areas from the current ridings of Surrey North and South Surrey—White Rock—Cloverdale while losing significant portions of its current territory to the new districts of Cloverdale—Langley City, South Surrey—White Rock and Surrey—Newton. These new boundaries were legally defined in the 2013 representation order, which came into effect upon the call of the 42nd Canadian federal election, scheduled for October 2015.

Members of Parliament

Election results

See also
 List of Canadian federal electoral districts
 Past Canadian electoral districts

References

 Library of Parliament Riding Profile
 Website of the Parliament of Canada
 Expenditures - 2008
 Expenditures - 2004

Notes

British Columbia federal electoral districts
Federal electoral districts in Greater Vancouver and the Fraser Valley
Barnston Island (British Columbia)
Politics of Surrey, British Columbia